Paul Spencer Sochaczewski (born August 1, 1947 in Brooklyn, New York) is an American-French writer, writing coach, conservationist and communications advisor to international non-governmental organizations. He lives in Geneva, Switzerland, and has lived and worked in more than 80 countries, including long stints in Indonesia, Singapore, Malaysia and Thailand.

In 1992, Sochacazewski changed his name from Paul Spencer Wachtel to Paul Spencer Sochaczewski; he wrote about the name change for an article in the International Herald Tribune.

Career

Paul Sochaczewski graduated in 1969 from George Washington University, in Washington, D.C. with a degree in psychology.

He served in the United States Peace Corps, 1969-1971, working as an education advisor in Sarawak, Malaysia. This exposure to Asia informed his writing and as a result most of his work has a Southeast Asian theme.

He was a freelance journalist and creative director of J. Walter Thompson in Indonesia.

He was founder and chairman of IGOLF-International Golf and Life Foundation, an international NGO which promoted environmental and social responsibility in the sport.

As head of creative services at WWF-World Wide Fund for Nature, 1981-1994, he created international public awareness campaigns to protect rainforests, wetlands, plants and biological diversity; and managed the WWF Faith and Environment Network. From mid-1992 to mid-1993 he took a leave of absence from WWF to write articles on environmental problems in the Pacific for the Environment Program at the East-West Center in Honolulu. He then worked for ten years as global communications director of the International Osteoporosis Foundation.

He has lived and worked in some 80 countries, speaks Bahasa Indonesia and French, and basic Thai.
Affiliations: Fellow, Royal Geographical Society, member PEN International, member American Society of Journalists and Authors, IUCN-World Conservation Union commissions on protected areas and education.

Writing

Themes and style 

Several themes recur in Sochaczewski’s work. How arrogance and greed of power brokers in the capital cities of Asia leads to environmental destruction and cultural disruption. The process by which isolated communities adapt to life in a modern world. Our need/fear relationship with nature. The romance of the "hero's journey."

Sochaczewski is particularly interested in Asian stories that defy western Cartesian logic. He writes about the love affair between the Sultan of Yogyakarta (Java) and the mystical Mermaid Queen. He explains why isolated Indian villagers are angry at the Monkey God Hanuman for not returning their sacred mountain. He investigates why Burmese generals use the perceived power of the white elephant to solidify their hold on power, and how a rural woman in the Himalayas changed government conservation policy by hugging a tree.

His books and articles have exposed the cultural genocide of the Penan people of Sarawak, Malaysia, helped to generate a renaissance of appreciation for British naturalist and explorer Alfred Russel Wallace and identified Eco-Cultural Revolutions which have had major impacts on our relationship with nature.

Reviewers have noted his innovative style and approach; Jeffrey Sayer, founding director general of the Centre for International Forestry Research in Bogor, Indonesia, and professor of conservation and development at James Cook University, Australia says: "This book [An Inordinate Fondness for Beetles] occupies a new category of non-fiction – part personal travelogue, part incisive biography of Wallace, part unexpected traveler’s tales."

Articles and personal essays 

Sochaczewski has published more than 600 by-lined articles in the International Herald Tribune, The New York Times, The Wall Street Journal, Reader’s Digest, Travel and Leisure, Bangkok Post and other publications.

Books 

He has written or co-authored 19 books of non-fiction, personal travel, and fiction.

They include: 

A Conservation Notebook: Ego, Greed, and Adorable Orangutans — Tales from a Half-Century on the Environmental Front Lines. 
The reader joins Sochaczewski on encounters that wander from UN-bureaucracies to the wild regions of Indonesian New Guinea, from a mythical sacred mountain in India to a holy grove in Myanmar, from bioprospecting on the coral reefs of Micronesia to a “war of the trees” regreening program in Zimbabwe, from brave people with good intentions to powerful folks with greed tarnishing their hearts.
The book is a highly personal collection of adventures, traveler’s tales, and outlying ideas, reflecting five decades of work in nature conservation. It offers no easy solutions, no sanctimonious scolding.
Tobgay Sonam Namgyal, former head of the Bhutan Trust Fund for Environmental Conservation, says: "Sochaczewski’s story is an enduring inspiration against the daily onslaught of war, disease, poverty and short-term thinking that threaten our natural heritage. It is a wonderful tribute to the movements and characters behind modern nature conservation.”

Searching for Ganesha: Collecting Images of the Sweet-Loving, Elephant-Headed Hindu Deity Everybody Admires. Ganesha, the Hindu elephant-headed god is among the most-treasured of all deities. In this book Sochaczewski explores why he collects Ganesha images, including theories on why people collect suggested by Sigmund Freud and Carl Jung. He explains how Hindu public relations experts retrofitted Ganesha in to the Mahabharata and the inspiration Hindu propaganda experts took from nature. Nigel Barley (anthropologist), former curator for Southeast Asia at the British Museum, said “Sochaczewski wears his considerable scholarship lightly – as any good guide should – and leads us confidently down many side-alleys of culture and experience. Light and funny, it still touches bedrock at multiple points – a delightful book. During the first week of sales the book became a number one bestseller in three categories of Amazon Kindle books – Biographies in Hinduism, Asian Travel Photography, and Private Museums and Collections.

BookLife Prize judges rated the book 9.5 out of 10, noting it is: “Filled with countless gorgeous photos and interesting stories regarding Sochaczewski’s travels, Searching for Ganesha is a charming, unusual, read. A wonderful writer, his voice cuts through his prose in the best way, and one can imagine he would be delightful to listen to over a glass of wine. Takes what could be a dusty topic and makes it humorous and even enchanting. Even readers who are unfamiliar with Ganesha will find the author’s enthusiasm to be contagious.”

EarthLove: Chronicles of the Rainforest War. A satiric Borneo eco-adventure that chronicles the fight to save the rainforest, its people, and orangutans from oil palm devastation.” James. C. Clad, former U.S. deputy assistant secretary of defense for Asia said EarthLove offers “a take-no prisoners antidote to dithering diplomats, impenetrable scientific studies, and finger-wagging scoldings. Merciless, hilarious, and thought-provoking.”

Dead, But Still Kicking. Sochaczewski travels to Indonesia, Myanmar, the United Kingdom, and Switzerland to meet mediums and shamans in an attempt to speak with spirits of dead folks.
Contacted via a medium, Arthur Conan Doyle said: “Enlightening. A noble companion volume to my own books on spiritualism.”

Exceptional Encounters: Enhanced Reality Tales from Southeast Asia. Simon Lyster, chairman of the World Land Trust said: “Once again, Sochaczewski has pushed the frontier of travel literature in an exciting new direction.” Benedict Allen, BBC presenter and author of Into the Crocodile’s Nest; Journey Inside New Guinea, said: “This is Sochaczewski at his very best – sharp, witty, energetic, and unafraid to be irreverent. Reminds me of the satire of Tom Wolfe combined with the insightful travel memoirs of Bill Bryson and Mark Twain.”

Share Your Journey - Mastering Personal Writing. The (surprisingly easy) techniques professional writers use to write personal memoirs and travel stories that connect with editors and readers. Thomas Bass, author of The Spy Who Loved Us and professor at State University of New York, said: "If you want to write, if you want to improve your writing, if you want your writing to leap off the page and click its heels in mid-air, read this book and follow its good advice. This is a lifetime’s wisdom, offered by a pro."

Curious Encounters of the Human Kind: True Asian Tales of Folly, Greed, Ambition and Dreams. (five volumes covering Myanmar (Burma), Indonesia, Himalaya, Borneo, Southeast Asia). Gary Braver, bestselling author of Skin Deep, said: "Paul’s writing in The Sultan and the Mermaid Queen has the humanity of Somerset Maugham, the adventure of Joseph Conrad, the perception of Paul Theroux, and a self-effacing voice uniquely his own."

An Inordinate Fondness for Beetles: Campfire Conversations with Alfred Russel Wallace on People and Nature Based on Common Travel in the Malay Archipelago, The Land of the Orangutan and the Bird of Paradise, Peter H. Raven, president emeritus at the Missouri Botanical Garden said: "A fascinating journey through the tropics of Southeast Asia, Sochaczewski not only follows in the footsteps of Alfred Russel Wallace but engages in a dialogue with him for the whole journey. Thought-provoking about change and constancy, and a delight to read."

Distant Greens: Golf, Life, and Surprising Serendipity On and Off the Fairways. Distant Greens travels to “crypto-golf” courses – locations where golf oughtn’t be. It also travels into the soul of golf, the rituals, the beliefs, and asks why people cheat and why do golfers remember the bad shots instead of the good shots? It ends by asking whether golf and nature can support each other? Rick Lipsey, of Sports Illustrated, said: "Distant Greens is an intimate golfing tour that travels to all corners of the planet and brings us into the heart, mind and soul of the game that we all love."

The Sultan and the Mermaid Queen: Extraordinary Asian People and Places, and Things that Go Bump in the Night. A compilation of unusual travel in Southeast Asia. James Fahn, author of A Land on Fire and executive director of the Earth Journalism Network, said: "Sochaczewski is blessed with a relentlessly probing curiosity, an easy-to-read writing style and a sensitive soul. His explorations of the remote jungles, far-flung archipelagoes and quirky characters of Asia leave us with fascinating accounts that mix natural history and modern-day reporting to investigate old fables and inspire new ones."

Redheads. A comic eco-thriller novel set in the rainforests of a fictional Borneo sultanate, concerns the plight of orangutans and Penan people threatened by forest destruction. Daniel Quinn, author of Ishmael, said: "Redheads does for the struggle to save the rain forests of Borneo what Catch-22 did for the struggle to stay alive in World War II."

Soul of the Tiger: Searching for Nature’s Answers in Southeast Asia. (co-author: Jeffrey A. McNeely).
George Schaller, director of Wildlife Conservation Society, said: this was "a marvelous book, unique, intelligent, attuned to cultures and filled with stimulating ideas."

Bibliography

A Conservation Notebook: Ego, Greed, and Adorable Orangutans — Tales from a Half-Century on the Environmental Front Lines.  Explorer’s Eye Press. 2022. . 

Searching for Ganesha: Collecting Images of the Sweet-Loving, Elephant-Headed Deity Everybody Admires.  Explorer’s Eye Press. 2021. .  

EarthLove: Chronicles of the Rainforest War. Explorer’s Eye Press. 2020. .

Dead, But Still Kicking: Encounters with Mediums, Shamans, and Spirits. Explorer’s Eye Press. 2019. .

Exceptional Encounters: Enhanced Reality Tales from Southeast Asia. Explorer’s Eye Press. 2018. .

Share Your Journey - Mastering Personal Writing. The (surprisingly easy) techniques professional writers use to write personal memoirs and travel stories that connect with editors and readers. Explorer’s Eye Press. 2016. .

Curious Encounters of the Human Kind: True Asian Tales of Folly, Greed, Ambition and Dreams. (five volumes covering Myanmar (Burma), Indonesia, Himalaya, Borneo, Southeast Asia). Explorer’s Eye Press. 2015. .

An Inordinate Fondness for Beetles: Campfire Conversations with Alfred Russel Wallace on People and Nature Based on Common Travel in the Malay Archipelago, The Land of the Orangutan and the Bird of Paradise. Explorer’s Eye Press. 2017 (second edition). .

The Sultan and the Mermaid Queen: Extraordinary Asian People and Places, and Things that Go Bump in the Night. Éditions Didier Millet. 2008. .

Distant Greens: Golf, Life, and Surprising Serendipity On and Off the Fairways. Explorer’s Eye Press. 2016 (second edition). .

Redheads. Explorer’s Eye Press. 2016 (third edition). . 

Siddharta. 2000. . 
Lontar. 2012. .

Soul of the Tiger: Searching for Nature’s Answers in Southeast Asia (co-author: Jeffrey A. McNeely)
Doubleday. 1988. . 
Paragon. New York. 1988. 1-55778-280-6.
Oxford University Press. 1991. .
Sho Koh Na. Japan. 1993. .
University of Hawai’i Press. 1995. .

Eco Bluff Your Way to Greenism: The Guide to Instant Environmental Credibility
Bonus Books, Inc. 1991. . (co-author: Jeffrey A. McNeely)

Tanah Air: Celebrating Indonesia’s Biodiversity. Archipelago Press. . (book concept initiator)

Indonesian Heritage Series (15 volumes). Archipelago Press. 1996. (editorial advisory board). .

Encyclopedia of Malaysia (16 volumes). Editions Didier Millet. 1998–2007. (editorial advisory board).

Malaysia: Heart of Southeast Asia. Archipelago Press. 1991. Singapore.  (writing as Paul Wachtel)

Writing workshops

He has developed writing workshops which have been run in more than twenty countries.
 Exploring Your Personal Odyssey
 Sharing the Journey
 Almost Famous
 Breaking Through
 Wake-Up Writing

Lectures

Sochaczewski lectures widely; his presentations include:
 Alfred Russel Wallace - Hero’s Journey in Southeast Asia
 Travels in Search of Eco-Dharma
 Things That Go Bump in the Night
 Hantus in the House - Indonesia’s love of ghost stories

He has given his Alfred Russel Wallace presentation to groups worldwide including: Royal Society for Asian Affairs (UK), Royal Geographical Society (UK, Singapore, Hong Kong), Anglo-Indonesian Society (UK), London School of Economics, Travellers Club (UK), Bournemouth University, University of Hawaii, Asian Civilizations Museum (Singapore), University of Singapore, University of Malaysia, Siam Society (Thailand), Indonesian Heritage Society, Sarawak State Museum.

References

External links
 Official Website

Living people
American travel writers
American male non-fiction writers
Columbian College of Arts and Sciences alumni
American magazine writers
1947 births
Fellows of the Royal Geographical Society
Writers from Geneva